Tomas Mårten Klingberg (born 1 April 1968) is a Swedish actor, screenwriter and director. Klingberg is best known for his role as Nick in the films about  the police detective Martin Beck.

Selected filmography
Beck – Rum 302 (2015)
Cockpit (2012)
Once Upon a Time in Phuket (2011)
Kontorstid (2003)
Beck – Sista vittnet (2002)
Beck – Pojken i glaskulan (2002)
Beck – Annonsmannen (2002)
Beck – Okänd avsändare (2002)
Beck – Enslingen (2002)
Beck – Kartellen (2002)
Beck – Mannen utan ansikte (2001)
Beck – Hämndens pris (2001)
 (2000)
Två som oss (1999)
Opportunus (1997)
Skilda världar (1996)
Bröderna Fluff (1996)
Mitt sanna jag (1995)
Petri tårar (1995)
Bert (1994)
Fasadklättraren (1991)

Direction
2006 – Offside
Utan dig (2003)
Viktor och hans bröder (2002)

Screenplay
Utan dig (2003)
 1999 – Browalls

References

External links

Swedish male actors
1968 births
Living people
Swedish film directors
Swedish screenwriters
Swedish male screenwriters